Phamie Gow is a composer, singer, harpist, pianist, and recording artist.

Early life and education
Phamie was born in Scotland, though has lived in four different countries including France, Spain, America and England. She first publicly performed at the age of 11 and a half after teaching herself to play the Celtic harp in six months using a tutor book and cassette. In her teens she later studied piano with the late composer and concert pianist Ronald Stevenson. At only 16 years old Phamie was one of the first to be accepted to study a Bachelor of Arts Degree in Scottish Music at The Royal Scottish Academy of Music and Drama (now the Royal Conservatoire of Scotland) in Glasgow, Scotland whilst continuing to study classical piano. As it happens, in her early twenties she was invited back to teach the piano as part of the same course. 

Her first commission as a composer was at the age of 16 for a local short film on the Millenium when she wrote 'Annandale' which is featured on her 'Moments of Time' CD.
. 
Phamie left home at the age of 17 and soon after was one of the first 'Danny awards' winners in Glasgow's Celtic Connections festival which resulted in Phamie's second commission as a composer and wrote Lammermuir featuring the likes of Alasdair Fraser, Eric Rifler, Mairi Campbell etc. She also performed centre stage in the main hall at the Glasgow Royal Concert Hall opening for Seaumus Heaney and Liam O Flynn and used this opportunity to sing in public for the first time to a full auditorium. 'Lammermuir'later became Phamie's second album which she licensed at that time to Greentrax from Wildfire Records and Publishing, of which she is now Director and owner. Twenty years later to the very day of the premiere, 'Lammermuir' was performed in its orchestral form with the Royal Scottish National Orchestra (RSNO) and soloists Mairi Campbell, Alasdair Fraser, Jarlath Henderson conducted by Teddy Abraham.

Music 
Phamie has released 10 solo albums and her debut album, Winged Spirit, when she was 19. 

She has been invited as a headlining musician to perform around Europe, United Kingdom, North and South America (Brazil, Chile, Argentina, Paraguay), Canada, China. 

Her 9th release, with the effort from crowdfunding donations Beyond the Milky Waycame to fruition, and was chosen for Classic FM's Drive Discovery, and was described on Alan Titchmarsh' show as being his 'Great British discovery'. The piano solo composition Sweet Frederik has reached over 10 million plays on Spotify in less than a year. Her eighth album, Softly Spoken, was chosen as "Album of the Week" by John Suchet at Classic FM.  Her seventh, released in August 2012, The Angels' Share which includes Edinburgh, was a commissioned work featuring Classic Brit Award winners, the Royal Scots Dragoon Guards and the London Metropolitan Orchestra, recorded in Metropolis Studios, Chiswick, London. A composition from the album was incorporated and choreographed for The Royal Edinburgh Military Tattoo in 2012, and was also broadcast on BBC 1 TV.  Phamie's work has been featured on the BBC 4 TV documentary about Royal Scots Dragoon Guards.

Phamie has performed around the world on such occasions as the Opening of the Scottish Parliament in Edinburgh in July 2011, where Queen Elizabeth II of the United Kingdom was present, albeit not directly while Phamie performed; the Closing Ceremony of the London Olympics 2012 in Scotland House, Pall Mall, London, commissioned by the Scottish Government and Creative Scotland. Phamie has performed for the Dalai Lama; Princess Anne and sang with The St Giles Cathedral Choir as a chorister for The Order of The Thistle Her Majesty the Queen.

In 2007 she morphed her performing skills in a different nature and starred in The Broadway sellout show, Tapeire, which led to her performing on the Regis and Kelly Show in the USA alongside world-renowned Irish tap dancer James Divine and Canada's Celtic superstar fiddler Ashley MacIsaac. Phamie has worked and collaborated with many international artists such as Philip Glass (USA), Carlos Núñez (Spain), Marisa Monte (Brasil), Ashley MacIsaac (Canada), and Alan Stivell (France), Kepa Junkera (Bilbao) and more.

Phamie was commissioned to write and musically direct the Vox Motus production of The Infamous Brothers Davenport, which had a run of 32 performances in Edinburgh's Royal Lyceum, Glasgow's Citizen's Theatre and the Eden Court Theatre in Inverness.

Phamie is the founder and director of Wildfire Records and Publishing, which has published over 30 sound recordings digitally, and numerous books of original piano music and scores. 

Her piano piece War Song made it to the 2021 Hall of Fame at Classic FM 2021 charts and has been released on numerous Classic FM/Universal compilation albums and is probably her more famed composition. Her works on the piano are regularly given airplay on Classic FM.[3]

She was officially the number one most played Artist in Caffè Nero for over two years running.

Another commissioned work by Hector Christie was to compose 'The Death of Tibbie Tamson' to raise awareness of this Scottish Borders' story.

In July 2022 Phamie's music has been chosen to be performed at The Horse Guard Parade by The Household Division in the show A Military Musical Spectacular to an audience of 10,000 people each show in celebration of Her Majesty the Queen's Platinum Jubilee.

Charity Concerts 
Phamie was the first World Peace Tartan Ambassador promoting peace in the world from the heart of Scotland. She is an ambassador for Nordoff-Robbins music therapy. In 2010 Phamie organised benefit concert 'A Cry Out for Chile', with the money raised going to the Chilean Red Cross and the Victor Jara Society to help victims of the earth quake and tsunami there. In 2008 Philip Glass invited her to take part in the 'Tibet House Benefit Concert' at the Carnegie Hall in New York. She performed with Band of Horses, Marisa Monte, Ashley MacIsaac, and Ray Davies and alongside Sufjan Stevens.[2]. She also sang in Mahler's Symphony no 8 in the Carnegie Hall, New York in January 2013. In 2015 she won the kindred spirit award for music. Phamie also made a guest appearance for a benefit concert for Ukraine at The Voodoo Lounge, Edinburgh, UK. Scotland in May 2022.

Commissions

 1997: commissioned to write for the opening of the extension to Edinburgh Airport. 'Highflyer'
 1998: commissioned to write the sound track to a short film about Dumfries and Galloway. 'Annandale'
 1999: New Voices Commission for Celtic Connections, Glasgow, Scotland. 'Lammermuir' 
 1999: commissioned to write the musical score for The Winters Tale theatre production directed by Hugh Hogart at The Royal Scottish Academy of Music and Drama. Glasgow. Scotland
 2000: commissioned to write a song for the Gaelic Choir of Edinburgh, Scotland.
 2000: commissioned to write the music for Le Roi Cerf by Le Petit Pied Theatre Company, Paris, France, directed by Josephine de Meaux
 2001: commissioned to write a composition for Real CD and wrote Death of Tibbie Tamson
 2001: commissioned to write sound track for Morpheus Theatre production of Pilot
 2002: commissioned to write the sound track for film Across the Waters by director Sana Bilgrami 
 2011: commissioned to write The Edinburgh Suite/ The Angels' Share by Tim Hollier of Atlantic Screen Music
 2012: commissioned by Vox Motus to write the sound track to the theatre production of The Infamous Brothers Davenport

Discography 

 1999 – Winged Spirit
 2001 – Lammermuir
 2005 – Dancing Hands
 2007 – Moments of Time
 2008 – La Vida Buena – The Good Life
 2011 – Road of the Loving Heart
 2012 – The Angels' Share
 2013 – Softly Spoken
 2018 – Beyond the Milky Way
 2018 –  "The Peace Farmer" (single-digital)
 2019 – The Sea Inside of Me Single and EP
 2019 – Bu Tusa An Gaol
 2019 – The Traveller
 2019 – In the Bleak Midwinter  single and EP
 2020 - Stone Dance of the Chameleon single
 2020 - You are my Haven single
 2020 - Seeing the Light single
 2020 - Summer Rain single
 2020 - Harp Land single
 2020 - Leaving Lonely Lands single
 2020 - Piano Improvisations - album (digital version)
 2021 - Piano Improvisations album
 2021 - Hope is the thing with feathers Single
 2021 - 9/11 I'm Still Waiting Single
 2022 - Peace Song for Ukraine Single

References

External links 
 
 http://www.classicfm.com/artists/phamie-gow/news/phamie-gow-softly-spoken-interview/
 https://www.scottishfield.co.uk/culture/music/musician-phamie-gow-is-in-tune-with-the-universe/
 http://www.facebook.com/phamiegowfanpage/
 http://www.instagram/phamiegow/
 http://www.twitter/phamiegow/

Living people
Scottish pianists
Scottish harpists
Scottish singer-songwriters
Scottish composers
21st-century pianists
Year of birth missing (living people)